List of champions of the 1903 U.S. National Championships tennis tournament (now known as the US Open). The men's tournament was held from 16 August to 24 August on the outdoor grass courts at the Newport Casino in Newport, Rhode Island. The women's tournament was held from 24 June to 27 June on the outdoor grass courts at the Philadelphia Cricket Club in Philadelphia, Pennsylvania. It was the 23rd U.S. National Championships and the second Grand Slam tournament of the year. British Laurence Doherty became the first non-US winner of the men's championship.

Finals

Men's singles

 Laurence Doherty (GBR) defeated  William Larned (USA) 6–0, 6–3, 10–8

Women's singles

 Elisabeth Moore (USA) defeated  Marion Jones (USA) 7–5, 8–6

Men's doubles
 Reginald Doherty (GBR) /  Laurence Doherty (GBR) defeated  Kreigh Collins (USA) /  Harry Wainder (USA) 7–5, 6–3, 6–3

Women's doubles
 Elisabeth Moore (USA) /  Carrie Neely (USA) defeated  Miriam Hall (USA) /  Marion Jones (USA) 4–6, 6–1, 6–1

Mixed doubles
 Helen Chapman (USA) /  Harry Allen (USA) defeated  Carrie Neely (USA) /  W. H. Rowland (USA) 6–4, 7–5

References

External links
Official US Open website

 
U.S. National Championships
U.S. National Championships (tennis) by year
U.S. National Championships
U.S. National Championships (tennis)
U.S. National Championships (tennis)
U.S. National Championships (tennis)
U.S. National Championships (tennis)